The 2017 World Shotgun Championships were held from August 30 to September 11, 2017 in Moscow, Russia. As in all odd-numbered years, separate ISSF World Shooting Championships is carried out in the Trap, Double Trap and Skeet events.

Competition schedule

Men

Women

 Held as a Grand Prix event and does not count towards medal standings.

Mixed events

Men Junior

Women Junior

Medal summary

Seniors

Juniors

References

ISSF World Shooting Championships
World Shotgun Championships
Shooting
World Shotgun Championships
World Shotgun Championships
Shooting competitions in Russia
World Shotgun Championships
World Shotgun Championships